Priest (Hangul: 프리스트) is a manhwa (Korean comic) series created by Hyung Min-woo. It fuses the Western genre with supernatural horror and dark fantasy themes and is notable for its unusual, angular art style. An interview with Hyung in Priest: Volume 3 states that the comic was inspired by the computer game Blood by Monolith Productions, which featured a similar horror-Western aesthetic and undead protagonist. He has also cited the comic as a mishmash of influences from other books, movies and games, elements from a culture that he felt was underground in Korea at the time.
 
Priest was published in English by Tokyopop. The manhwa was adapted into the 2011 American horror film of the same name.

Story
Priest tells the story of humanity's battle against 12 fallen angels. The angels descended to Earth to 'play God' among humans, who build a temple and statues in their honor. For their rebellion against him, God destroyed their temple, imprisoned their souls in statues, and buried the statues underground.

Centuries later, a Holy Knight named Vascar De Gullion loses his family. He 'loses faith' and wanders the earth in a 'blood rage.' He discovers a cave containing the statues of the 12 fallen angels. Temozarela convinces Vascar De Gullion to give up his body to the angel to take revenge against God. Vascar De Gullion is discovered by a powerful priest, Betheal. He discovers that Vascar De Gullion is actually Temozarela. Betheal traps their souls within a powerful weapon called the Domas Porada, becoming the demon Belial in the process.

Ivan Isaacs solves the puzzle of the Domas Porada, freeing Temozarela. The angel murders Isaacs' love, Gena, after escaping. Priest follows Ivan Isaacs' quest for revenge against the fallen angel, Temozarela, and his 12 angelic disciples, with assistance from Belial and others.

Characters

Main

Ivan Isaacs
The main protagonist of Priest. Ivan lived in an orphanage until Mr. Isaacs, a wealthy farm owner, adopted him after his wife died to be a companion for his daughter. Fond of ancient stories and myths, he spent his time researching in his own library and with Gena Isaacs, whom he eventually falls in love. When Mr. Isaacs finds out, he reprimands Ivan. His father sends him off to a boarding school called Conrad to get him away from Gena. Ivan returns after becoming a priest. An essay he wrote brings him to the attention of an Order of St. Vinetz. They approach him to help unlock the secrets of the Domas Porada, which contains the souls of Temozarela and Belial.

After reading through a book, Ivan finds blood in it and confronts Piestro. He admits his true plan is to let Temozarela free. Temozarela, realizing that Ivan could liberate him, tells Piestro to sacrifice Gena in front of the Domas Porada. During this, Ivan goes into a stupor and attempts to open the Domas Porada. He is transported inside the Domas Porada finding Temozarela imprisoned and Belial standing watch. Belial reprimands Isaac for entering the relic as the archangel breaks free.

Ivan stalks the west as an undead creature sustained solely by his infinite rage; his strength directly related to his anger. He also uses weapons: a Bowie knife he coats with blessed silver, a sawed off shotgun with silver bullets, and a Thompson sub-machine gun.

Betheal Gavarre (Belial)
Belial was originally an inquisitor in the medieval church called Betheal. He presided over the case of the possessed Vascar de Guillon. Temozarela, possessing Vascar, influences Betheal's adoptive son, Matthew, to slaughter one of the women at the monastery. Temozarela orchestrated this tragedy to shatter Betheal's faith. In remorse and enraged, Betheal sacrifices himself, condemns his faith, renounces God, and becomes the devil Belial. Betheal uses his new power to imprison Temozarela and himself in the Domas Porada. After Temozarela is freed, he melds with Ivan's body to help him defeat the angels.

Gena Isaacs
The natural daughter of Mister Isaacs, a ranch owner who adopted Ivan. Gena eventually falls in love with Ivan despite being his adoptive sister, but is killed by Temozarela's minions. The Order of St Vertinez uses her to make Ivan finally snap and release Temozarela. She is killed while calling Ivan's name and dies in his arms. He brings Gena's body back to the ranch. Belial appears and Ivan leaves her to talk with him. At this time, a servant of Temozarela, appears and raises the dead of a nearby graveyard. Ivan sees them and runs into the house for Gena, finding several zombies feeding on her flesh. Gena comes back to life as a zombie. She pleads with him to love her still, but he refuses at Belial's words and stabs her with a scythe. After killing the zombies, he takes her corpse and buries her in a makeshift grave with a cross at the head.

Gena later appears as a visage to Ivan and other characters. Most notably, when Ivan is about to be killed by Achmode. Ivan finally begins to accept death and we see Gena in a field in front of him, before Armandiel saves him. She also appeared as a hallucination to Lizzie, saying nothing and just touching her heart after Lizzie almost succumbs to Temozarela.

Coburn
Coburn is a cynical atheist and a federal marshal hired by the government to investigate Ivan and Temozarela. He first appears saving Lizzie from being hung as a witch, then subsequently hires her to help him find Isaac. He reveals to Lizzie how he knew her father. During Ivan's battle with Achmode, the group comes across Little Bosack ruined and inhabited by corpses. While Father Lucian stops to pray for the souls, every corpse comes alive and attacks them. Coburn protects the group with two guns and a whip.

Coburn tries to convince the mayor of Windtale that his city is in danger of an attack by Temozarela. His pleas are ignored, and Coburn leaves, remarking 'Either way, this town is doomed'. Coburn reappears when the village is surrounded by members of St. Vertinez who are about to attack. In the fight, he duels with Joshua. Joshua stabs him above the heart, but Coburn withdraws the sword and gives it back to Joshua, saying 'aim a bit higher.'

Lizzie
Lizzie is the leader of a gang of outlaws. The authorities catches her and places her on a train transporting her to be executed. After the gang massacres most of the train, they try to steal the cargo, but Ivan kills them. She witnesses Ivan's battle with Jarbilong. While watching, a zombie bites her. Jarbilong tried to make Lizzie his disciple, but dies before succeeding. After the battle, Ivan visits her and tells her he will kill her unless she commits suicide before the curse takes control. During her recovery, she asks Ivan for help, but he ignores her, saying 'Why do you ask me questions which God himself doesn't answer?' She cuts her long hair and recruits a mysterious clan to help her quest against Ivan.

Father Lucian
The Vatican assigned Father Lucian to Coburn as a religious assistant in his pursuit of Ivan and Temozarela. He is calm and collected, preferring pacifism to violence. When Lizzie catches the plague, he heals her temporarily with holy water and prayer. After they find Ivan Isaacs, he reveals to Coburn that Betheal Gavarre is controlling Ivan. Lucian later appears with Coburn and attempts to persuade the townsfolk of Windtale to allow federal government into their town. When the Order of St. Vertinez surrounds Windtale, Lucian warns the mayor of Windtale about the impending danger. He notices the hanging body of Netraphim and speculates the town is going to Hell.

Cairo
Cairo is an Indigenous American (possibly of the Apache tribe) traveling with Coburn. He is skilled with knives, and throws them with fatal accuracy. He is an expert tracker sent to locate Ivan Isaacs. Later, he attacks members of St. Vertinez after witnessing them murder a small child from an infected village. He continues fighting before Antione, a member of St. Vertinez, murders and dismembers him. Seeing this, Coburn renounces the Vatican, saying 'From now on, the cross will only be the sign of the enemy to me.'

The Fallen Angels

Temozarela

Temozarela is an arch-angel who fought on God's side in the war against Lucifer. This war caused God to lose faith in the angels and begin preferring humanity. A bitter Temozarela took twelve empathetic angels to Earth to prove that humans were more fallible than angels. He set up a cult that worshiped him through ritual sacrifice. This only angered God and he banished Temozarela to the earth, imprisoning him in a statue. Years later, a Knight Templar called Vascar de Guillon fought in the crusades and led fearsome armies. His wife contracted a plague, but the doctors and priests said she was possessed by the devil. As a remedy, they burned de Guillon's castle with his wife and children inside. He discovered a hidden cavern on his "crusades of blood" that imprisoned Temozarela and his disciples. Temozarela explained how he and Vascar were both betrayed by God. In his fury, he gives his body to Temozarela who releases his angels and uses them to possess the Vascar's knights.

100 years later, Temozarela tries to seduce Betheal, but Betheal resists and eventually imprisons both himself and Temozarela in the Domas Porada. Belial and his battle causes Temozarela's body to be horribly burned. His life is saved by four of his Dark Apostles: Netraphim, Jarbilong, Achmode, and Armand.

Temozarela's actions are sometimes contradictory, indicating a deeper wish for Ivan to continue on his pilgrimage. He gives non-lethal powers to Jarbilong and slays Achmode after he eats Ivan's arm. Belial tells Ivan that his quest for blood is Temozarela's bidding, but Ivan ignores him.

Jarbilong
Jarbilong is one of the twelve Angels who rebelled against God with Temozarela. He was present at Temozarela's release from the Domas Porada, but played little part in the battles with Belial. After this event he turns the townspeople of Saint Baldlas into zombies that attack Ivan. He has the 'gift' of merging his spirit with any of his disciples at will, giving him an inexhaustible supply of bodies. Ivan used Voodoo magic to damage all of Jarbilong's servants by attacking his soul instead of the angel's body. Wounded, the 11th Angel revealed his hideous true form. Jarbilong impales Ivan on one of his arms. Belial possesses Ivan and defeats Jarbilong, eventually impaling the angel on his own blades. In his final moments before dying, Jarbilong tells Ivan that Temozarela could destroy him if he wished, but the angel has plans for him.

Achmode
The second Fallen Angel to battle Ivan on his pilgrimage, Achmode fancies himself both an artist and a beast. After turning a village into mindless zombies, Achmode creates undead killers and winged monstrosities by mutilating the zombie bodies. His sacred site is Small Bosack.

Ivan is confronted by Achmode's latest modification, Christine, a child deformed into a hawk-like form. Achmode offers Ivan a glimpse of Christine's "dream", that retells the heretical angels' fall. When Ivan kills Christine with the Belial's help, Achmode is further enraged by insults about his 'glorious past' being little more than mindless instinct. Achmode decides to kill Ivan himself, despite Temozarela's orders to the contrary. In their battle, Ivan's best efforts to destroy Achmode fall short, and Belial demands that Ivan turn complete control of his body over to him. Ivan refuses. As Achmode is about to kill Ivan, Armandiel, Temozarela's lieutenant, intervenes. He accuses Achmode of betraying their lord and slays him, saying 'He does not resent your foolish yearning to enter heaven.' In a bizarre twist, Armandiel grants Ivan the severed arm of Achmode to replace his, saying that it will make him more than human and bolster his power.

Armand/Armandiel
He is possibly the most powerful of the Fallen Angels, especially considering his status of High Priest in Temozarela's Black Sabbath. He is part of the party that rescues a burnt Temozarela from the Domas Porada. He is depicted as a handsome young man with long, straight hair, dressed in 19th century formal wear. In his first appearance, he gives Jarbilong his orders and advises him on how to fight Ivan and Belial. He is later pleased with Jarbilong's defeat. He also is able to distract opponents with roses and the folds of his cape. Even though he is Ivan's ally against Achmode, he later wounds Ivan so badly that Belial is unable to heal him.

Netraphim
Another of the Fallen Angels, Netraphim resembles a young woman and is accompanied by a giant wolf named Bendo. Against Temozarela's orders, she protects the unfortunate in the valley of Windtale. Her alias is 'Nera.' In heaven, she tried to stop Temozarela from leaving heaven, and had her wings ripped off as punishment. She asked to be killed because she was torn between her love for God and her secret attraction to Temozarela. Her life was spared and she joined Temozarela's angels. While on Earth, she sees the young orphan Dana, and Netraphim decides to repent for her sins.

Armand delivers Temozarela's word to Bendo, saying that Netraphim's defiance will not be punished as long as she does not utter a single word of regret or remorse. If so, he will destroy her. When her "family" is killed, she allows the angry townspeople to hang her. Before she dies, Temozarela visits her and offers her a place by his side, provided she regrets her existence. She refuses and dies.

Unnamed Figure
This Unnamed Figure is seen during the events of Ivan's fall from grace. Once Gena had been murdered, and the Domas Porada opened, a man arrived swathed in bandages bearing a lantern and a staff tipped with the symbol 'II'. The staff secretes a fluid that releases the zombies. The dead eventually try to devour Gena before Ivan destroys them. After this, the figure's lantern shatters setting fire to the graveyard and the mansion. He walks away prophesying 'Ivan Isaacs, we will meet again one day.' As the 'II' symbol occupies a space on Temozarela's circle (seen often relating to the demise of Jarbilong and Archmode) it is possible this man is another Fallen Angel or servant of Temozarela.

The Order of St. Vertinez
The Vatican created the Order of St. Vertinez to handle what Coburn describes as 'the vatican's dirty laundry.' Their real name is 'Michael's Sword.' They have the authority to take matters into their own hands without the Pope's knowledge. They are harsh and judgmental, killing anyone who disagrees with them as a service to the Church. Only 4 members are named. Their uniform consists of a white hooded robe with some members wearing masks.

Father Raul Piestro
Father Piestro was the head priest of Saint Vertinez before Temozarel's release. In his first appearance, he visits Ivan about an essay he submitted on the ideology in the church. Piestro explains that he was part of the investigation into Ivan Isaac after he submitted his paper, revealing that his research findings are absolutely correct, but that he should stop further research to avoid punishment. He asks Ivan to help them solve The Domas Porada. After finding blood in one of the books, Ivan confronts Piestro. The head of St. Vertinez explains how he was visited by Temozarela in a dream and that he believes the archangel brought a new message from God. Afterwards, he kills Gena. When the Domas Porada is opened, Temozarela kills all the members of St. Vertinez, before killing Piestro and remarking, 'Did you not ask to be rid of sin or desire?'

Father Joshua
One of possible current leaders of St. Vertinez, Joshua was recruited by Father Raul Piestro in an asylum. The asylum was run by Doctor Gerard, who St. Vertinez commissioned to create a new super-soldier. Joshua was one of only 3 who survived the process. He increased membership in the Order to reinforce his army against the heretics. He first appears praying at a ruined shrine with another priest, Antoine. Later, he takes part in wiping out an entire village that was infected by Temozarela's plague with other priests. Joshua is indifferent when his comrades die, remarking only 'Presume them martyrs'.

Father Antoine
Another possible leader of St. Vertinez, this priest has a marine-style haircut and has a hook instead of a left hand. During the experiments with Dr. Gerard, the drugs deformed his left hand rendering it useless. He cut it off and replaced it with an artificial device that could attach various implements for his use. He was held in the same asylum as Joshua and Baston before Piestro recruited him. The asylum's experiments gave him super-regenerative capabilities. He first appears praying with Father Joshua, and helps him fight Cairo.

Brother Baston
Piestro recruited Baston from the same asylum as the others. He is the strongest of the surviving priests, surpassing all of the tests given to him by Doctor Gerard. From the experiments he gained heightened senses and super physical strength, presumably along with regeneration.

Volume list
The Graphic novels have been out of print since Tokyo Pop ceased business, however, now that they have resumed parts of business the books are available for digital download on amazon.com.

In other media

MMO game
A massively multiplayer online game based on the comic was in production by South Korean developer JC Entertainment back in 2003, but was later cancelled following being renamed Rust Online. Appropriately given the comic's inspiration, the game attempted to meld in elements of first-person shooters; combat was real time and aiming and movement directly controlled by the player. Successful attacks brought players more experience points. The game featured two factions: Heretics, who side with Temozarela, and Templars who are more aligned with Ivan Isaacs. Players were then further divided into four weapons classes (leader, fighter, distance weapon and mage), with both demonic and spiritual abilities. Set among 48 different environments in New Mexico (including ghost towns, mines and desserts), factions would fight for control of twelve "sacred sites" which provide bonuses to the possessing faction. The conflict to control each of the counties containing these sites formed the basis of the main faction vs. faction mode. Other modes included single player and player vs. player. JC Entertainment described the game as controversial, owing to its graphic violence and religious mysticism. The game received extensive previews from The Adrenaline Vault and IGN's RPG Vault.

Film adaptation

Priest is a 2011 action horror film loosely based on the manhwa, although the director claimed it was set in the comic's far future. It is directed by Scott Stewart and stars Paul Bettany as the title character. A prequel comic, Priest: Purgatory, was begun in an attempt to bridge the original manhwa with the movie, although it was never completed. Min Woo Hyung was largely supportive of the movie, praising the visuals, even if missing the comic's philosophical aspects.

Cultural influence
The progressive metal band Dream Theater's song "In the Presence of Enemies" features a storyline patterned after Priest's plot with lyrics directly quoting the official English translation of Volume 1. A character called Priest also appears in the brawler game Lost Saga by South Korean developer I.O. Entertainment. It has also been regularly cited as an example for manhwa to Western audiences, as well as analysed for its religious content and cultural connections.

See also
Blood, the primary influence on Priest
Science fiction Western
"In the Presence of Enemies", a song by progressive metal band Dream Theater about Priest Volume 1.

Notes

External links
Tokyopop's Priest Section

Action-adventure comics
Horror comics
Western (genre) comics
Daewon C.I. titles
Tokyopop titles
1998 comics debuts
Fictional vampire hunters
Manhwa adapted into films
Vampires in comics